The St. Cloud State Huskies women's ice hockey team is a National Collegiate Athletic Association (NCAA) Division I college ice hockey That represents St. Cloud State University. The Huskies are a member of the Western Collegiate Hockey Association.They play at the Herb Brooks National Hockey Center in St. Cloud Minnesota.

History
In 2010, Felicia Nelson became the first Huskies player to be a Top 10 finalist for the Patty Kazmaier Award. The club had a 15–14–8 overall
record in 2009–10 and an 11–11–6 mark in the WCHA. The team finished the season in third place. This was the first time in school and league history that St. Cloud State was one of
the top three schools in the standings.

In the 2015–16 NCAA season, Katie Fitzgerald was the starting goaltender for the St. Cloud State University Huskies. She would lead all goaltenders in the WCHA conference in shots faced, appearing in 34 games played. Her final win on home ice at St. Cloud took place on February 12, as she made 39 saves in a win against North Dakota, besting All-America goaltender Shelby Amsley-Benzie.

Season-by-season results

Current roster
As of August 21, 2022.

Awards and honors
 Kayla Friesen, WCHA Rookie of the Week (Week of January 24, 2017)
 Caitlin Hogan,  2010 Patty Kazmaier Award nominee
 Caitlin Hogan, 2010 Frozen Four Skills Competition participant
Molli Mott, WCHA Rookie of the Week (Week of February 16, 2011)
 Felicia Nelson, 2010 Patty Kazmaier Award nominee
 Felicia Nelson, 2010 Women's RBK Hockey Division I All-America Second Team 
Ashley Nixon, WCHA Defensive Player of the Week (Week of December 7, 2010) 
 Holly Roberts, WCHA Offensive Player of the Week (Week of February 17, 2010)

Statistical leaders
 Felicia Nelson, NCAA leader, 2009–10 season, Goals per game, 0.91

Huskies in professional hockey

See also
St. Cloud State Huskies men's ice hockey
St. Cloud State Huskies
St. Cloud State University

References

 
Ice hockey teams in Minnesota